Józef Drzazga (1914–1978) was a Polish Catholic priest, bishop of Warmia from 1972 to 1978. He was the first post-World War II bishop on that post. He has been a titular bishop of Sinidado in Warmia since 1958.

|-

1914 births
1978 deaths
Bishops of Warmia
Participants in the Second Vatican Council
20th-century Roman Catholic bishops in Poland